Jo-Wilfried Tsonga was the defending champion, but due to injury did not defend his title.

Dominic Thiem won the title, defeating Gilles Simon in the final, 3–6, 7–6(7–2), 6–1.

Seeds
The top four seeds receive a bye into the second round.

Draw

Finals

Top half

Bottom half

Qualifying

Seeds

Qualifiers

Lucky losers

Qualifying draw

First qualifier

Second qualifier

Third qualifier

Fourth qualifier

External links
 Main Draw
 Qualifying Draw

2018 ATP World Tour
2018 Singles